Bradley Miguel Dirk Vliet (born 24 March 1998) is a Dutch professional footballer who plays as a left back for Canadian club Pacific FC.

Club career

Early career
Born in Rotterdam, Vliet played in the youth systems of Feyenoord, Sparta Rotterdam and NAC Breda. In the 2017–18 season, he sat on the bench for a few games for NAC in the Eredivisie, but did not make his senior debut. In 2018, he was on trial at RKC Waalwijk, but this did not result in a contract.

At the beginning of 2019, he joined the second team of SC Cambuur, and played in the Beloften Eredivisie. However, once again, he did not make an appearance for the first team. In 2019, after a trial period at SC Telstar, he left for Croatian Prva HNL club NK Lokomotiva. He did not play there either, and during the 2019–20 season he even trialled with ADO Den Haag in February, without this amounting to a move.

Dordrecht
In the summer of 2020, Vliet joined FC Dordrecht on a free transfer. On 30 August 2020, he finally made his professional debut, in the 0–0 home draw against Go Ahead Eagles. He came on as a substitute for Nikolas Agrafiotis in the 79th minute.

Cavalry FC
On 30 April 2022, Vliet signed with Canadian Premier League side Cavalry FC. Vliet's contract option for the 2023 season would be declined as a result of international roster requirements.

Pacific FC
On 13 January 2023, Canadian Premier League side Pacific FC signed Vliet to a 2 year contract, with a club option for the 2025 season.

References

External links
 
 

1998 births
Living people
Association football defenders
Dutch footballers
Dutch expatriate footballers
Footballers from Rotterdam
NAC Breda players
SC Cambuur players
NK Lokomotiva Zagreb players
FC Dordrecht players
Cavalry FC players
Pacific FC players
Eerste Divisie players
Canadian Premier League players
Expatriate footballers in Croatia
Dutch expatriate sportspeople in Croatia
Expatriate soccer players in Canada
Dutch expatriate sportspeople in Canada